On 21 January 2021, a fire broke out at an unregistered nursing home in Kharkiv, Ukraine. The fire killed 15 people and injured 11 others. Nine people were rescued and sent to the hospital.

History
According to Prosecutor General of Ukraine Iryna Venediktova, the fire was caused by carelessness with electrical heaters. This prompted the office of the Kharkiv regional prosecutor to begin criminal proceedings due to alleged violations of safety regulations. Electric heaters are considered unsafe in Kharkiv due to the inadequate design of electrical infrastructure in that area.

The house was heavily damaged, with much of the second floor apparently gutted. The fifteen people that died had apparently been trapped on the second floor.

Kharkiv's acting mayor Ihor Terekhov declared 22 January 2021 a day of mourning.

References

2021 fires in Europe
2021 in Ukraine
2021 fire
Fires in Ukraine
January 2021 events in Ukraine
Residential building fires
Urban fires in Europe
2021 disasters in Ukraine
Nursing homes